Muggiò (Milanese: Mugg) is a city (municipality) in the Province of Monza and Brianza in the Italian region Lombardy, located about  northeast of Milan.  It received the honorary title of city with a presidential decree on September 27, 1992.

Muggiò borders the following municipalities: Lissone, Desio, Monza, Nova Milanese, Cinisello Balsamo.

Main sights

Villa Casati Stampa di Soncino

Villa Casati Stampa, now the town hall of Muggiò, is a neoclassical building designed in 1798 by  Austrian architect Leopold Pollack. The residence was built on a pre-existing 16th century structure. The villa was surrounded by a park of more than twenty thousand square metres of surface (nearly five acres), designed as an English garden. Today, the park has been transformed and laid out as a sports ground.

Mausoleum of Casati Stampa di Soncino

The Mausoleum of Casati Stampa Soncino is a  commemorative monument in the urban cemetery of Muggiò, built in 1830.

Transport
Muggiò is served by Lissone-Muggiò railway station.

References

External links
 Official website